The women's 57 kg blind judo event at the 2015 European Games in Baku was held on 26 June at the Heydar Aliyev Arena.

Results

Repechage

References

External links
 

Wblind57
European Wblind57